Surduc Pass (in Romanian: Defileul Jiului or Pasul Surduc, in Hungarian Szurdok-szoros) is a mountain pass in the Gorj and Hunedoara counties of Southwestern Romania, connecting the Petroşani Depression with Oltenia.

In Surduc Pass, the Jiu River divides two mountain ranges that belong to the Southern Carpathians: the Vâlcan Mountains to the west and the Parâng Mountains to the east.

In 1947, a road (DN66, part of E79) and a railway line were opened that connect Transylvania with Wallachia (the two other passes in region are in the Timiş-Cerna Gap and Turnu Roşu Pass). In August 2005, a national park with an area of 110 km² was created in this pass.

The Romanian name of the pass derives from the Hungarian word "szurdok", which means "defile" or "canyon".

Mountain passes of Romania
Mountain passes of the Carpathians